The 2nd Independent Spirit Awards, honoring the best in independent filmmaking for 1986, were announced on March 28, 1987. The ceremony was hosted by Buck Henry and was held at 385 North, a restaurant in Los Angeles.

Winners and nominees

Films with multiple nominations and awards

Special awards

Special Distinction Award
'''A Room with a View
28 Up
Men...
Mona Lisa
My Beautiful Laundrette

References

External links
1986 Spirit Awards at IMDb

1986
Independent Spirit Awards